Suzanne Frances Scarlata is the Richard Whitcomb Professor at Worcester Polytechnic Institute. She is known for her work on how cells respond to hormones and neurotransmitters. She is an elected fellow of the American Association for the Advancement of Science.

Education and career 

Scarlata grew up in Philadelphia and received a B.A. from Temple University in 1979. She went on to earn her Ph.D. from the University of Illinois, Urbana-Champaign. After her Ph.D. she accepted a position at AT&T Bell Laboratories where she worked on methods for testing circuit boards. She then moved to New York City where she worked at Cornell University Medical College. In 1991 she moved to Stony Brook University where she remained for 24 years. In 2016 she moved to Worcester Polytechnic Institute where, as of 2022, she is the Richard Whitcomb Professor of Chemistry and Biochemistry. In 2016, Scarlata was elected president of the Biophysical Society.

Research 

In her own words, Scarlata is "fascinated by the way that cells grow, move, or die depending on their environment". Her early research examined the motion of fluorophores. She went on to examine histones under high pressure, the compression of lipid membranes, and the binding affinities of compounds within lipids. Scarlata is also interested in the use of enzymes to alter materials used in building construction. In 2021, Scarlata was involved in a research project that used the enzyme carbonic anhydrase to fix cracks in concrete.

Selected publications

Awards and honors 
In 2020 Scarlatta was elected a fellow of the American Association for the Advancement of Science.

References

External links 
 

Fellows of the American Association for the Advancement of Science
Temple University alumni
University of Illinois Urbana-Champaign alumni
Worcester Polytechnic Institute faculty
Biophysicists
Living people
Year of birth missing (living people)
Presidents of the Biophysical Society